FAW Jiefang is a truck manufacturing company headquartered in Changchun, Jilin, China, and a wholly owned subsidiary of FAW Group. It is the largest manufacturer of heavy trucks in China. FAW Jiefang was established in 2003 and has more than 22,000 employees, building more than 500 different models of 5-30 ton trucks. It has an annual production capacity of around 200,000 vehicles.

History
FAW Jiefang began as the FAW Car Co., Ltd, with its founding in 1953. The first truck rolled off of the lines in 1956.  The technology came by way of Russia (Soviet Union).

Subsidiaries and divisions
FAW Jiefang is made up of other subsidiaries and divisions.

Qingdao Truck Division
The Qingdao Truck Division, located in Qingdao, China, merged into FAW Group in 1993, and later was assigned to the FAW Jiefang company.  This subsidiary has 2,900 employees, and produces over 70,000 units per year.

WuXi Diesel Engine Works (FAWDE)
The WuXi Diesel Engine Works Division (also known as FAWDE), located in Wuxi, Jiangsu, has 4,000 employees and produces diesel engines for generator sets, water pumps, forklifts, farm equipment, and trucks.  They were formed in 1943 and became part of the FAW Group in 1992. They produce 150,000 diesel engines annually.

Deutz (Dalian) Engine
The Deutz (Dalian) Engine joint venture is managed through the FAW Jiefang subsidiary.

Models

Passenger vehicles (discontinued)
Jiefang Lubao CA6400UA, a hatchback based on the Austin Maestro.
Jiefang CA6440UA, a light commercial van based on the Austin Maestro van.
Jiefeng CA6440, a passenger/commercial van based on the E24 Nissan Caravan.
Jiefang Jiebao CA6350, a microvan

Heavy duty trucks
Trucks available in 6x2, 6x4 and 4x2 configurations.
Jiefang J4R (2002–present)
Jiefang J5K (2004–present)
Jiefang J5P (2004–present)
Jiefang J6L (2010–present)
Jiefang J6M (2007–present)
Jiefang J6P (2007–present)
Jiefang J7 Eagle (2017–present)
Jiefang JH6 (2014–present)

Light commercial trucks
 Jiefang T80/T90
 Jiefang Hu V (Tiger V)
 Jiefang J6F

Military use vehicles
Jiefang CA-10 - 1956-1986, licensed copy of ZIS-150
Jiefang CA-30 - 1958-1986, licensed copy of ZIL-157

The FAW Jiefang CA141/CA1091 is a five tonne capacity, 4x2 troop/cargo carrier truck developed and built by First Automobile Works and used by the People's Liberation Army of the People's Republic of China for transport. It entered service in 1980s along with Soviet GAZ-53 and ZIL-130 to replace the older Yuejin NJ130 (the copied version of the 2.5 ton Soviet GAZ-51) and Jiefang CA10 (the copied version of the 4 tonne Soviet ZIS-150).

References

External links

FAW Jiefeng website
Wuxi Diesel Engine Works, FAW Jiefang website

FAW Group divisions and subsidiaries
Truck manufacturers of China
Engine manufacturers of China
Government-owned companies of China
Vehicle manufacturing companies established in 2003
Chinese companies established in 2003
Companies based in Changchun
Diesel engine manufacturers